Calul may refer to the following rivers in Romania:

Calu, a tributary of the Bicaz in Harghita County
Calul (Bistrița), a tributary of the Bistrița in Neamț County
Calul, a tributary of the Priboiasa in Vâlcea County

See also 
 Valea Calului (disambiguation)